Joni Turunen (born 9 April 1976) is a Finnish boxer. He competed in the men's featherweight event at the 2000 Summer Olympics.

References

External links
 

1976 births
Living people
Finnish male boxers
Olympic boxers of Finland
Boxers at the 2000 Summer Olympics
Sportspeople from Vantaa
AIBA World Boxing Championships medalists
Featherweight boxers